Elsby is a surname. Notable people with the surname include:
Barry Elsby, British-born Falkland Islands doctor and politician
George Elsby (1902–1953), English cricketer
Ian Elsby (born 1960), English soccer player
Jim Elsby (1928–1987), English soccer player
Jimmy Elsby, British trade union official
Ted Elsby (1932–1985), Canadian football player

See also 
Joseph Elsby Martin Sr. (1916–1996), American boxing coach